The human shoulder is made up of three bones: the clavicle (collarbone), the scapula (shoulder blade), and the humerus (upper arm bone) as well as associated muscles, ligaments and tendons.  The articulations between the bones of the shoulder make up the shoulder joints. The shoulder joint, also known as the glenohumeral joint, is the major joint of the shoulder, but can more broadly include the acromioclavicular joint. In human anatomy, the shoulder joint comprises the part of the body where the humerus attaches to the scapula, and the head sits in the glenoid cavity. The shoulder is the group of structures in the region of the joint.

The shoulder joint is the main joint of the shoulder.  It is a ball and socket joint that allows the arm to rotate in a circular fashion or to hinge out and up away from the body.  The joint capsule is a soft tissue envelope that encircles the glenohumeral joint and attaches to the scapula, humerus, and head of the biceps. It is lined by a thin, smooth synovial membrane. The rotator cuff is a group of four muscles that surround the shoulder joint and contribute to the shoulder's stability. The muscles of the rotator cuff are supraspinatus, subscapularis, infraspinatus, and teres minor. The cuff adheres to the glenohumeral capsule and attaches to the humeral head.

The shoulder must be mobile enough for the wide range actions of the arms and hands, but stable enough to allow for actions such as lifting, pushing, and pulling.

Structure
The shoulder consists of a ball-and-socket joint formed by the humerus and scapula and their surrounding structures - ligaments, muscles, tendons - which support the bones and maintain the relationship of one to another. These supporting structures attach to the clavicle, humerus, and scapula, the latter providing the glenoid cavity, acromion and coracoid processes. The main joint of the shoulder is the shoulder joint (or glenohumeral joint), between the humerus and the glenoid process of the scapular. The acromioclavicular joint and sternoclavicular joint also play a role in shoulder movements. White hyaline cartilage on the ends of the bones (called articular cartilage) allows the bones to glide and move on each other, and the joint space is surrounded by a synovial membrane. Around the joint space are muscles - the rotator cuff, which directly surrounds and attaches to the shoulder joint - and other muscles that help provide stability and facilitate movement.

Two filmy sac-like structures called bursae permit smooth gliding between bone, muscle, and tendon. They cushion and protect the rotator cuff from the bony arch of the acromion.

The glenoid labrum is the second kind of cartilage in the shoulder which is distinctly different from the articular cartilage. This cartilage is more fibrous or rigid than the cartilage on the ends of the ball and socket. Also, this cartilage is also found only around the socket where it is attached.

Joint

The shoulder joint (also known as the glenohumeral joint) is the main joint of the shoulder. It is a ball and socket joint that allows the arm to rotate in a circular fashion or to hinge out and up away from the body.  It is formed by the articulation between the head of the humerus and the lateral scapula (specifically-the glenoid cavity of the scapula).  The "ball" of the joint is the rounded, medial anterior surface of the humerus and the "socket" is formed by the glenoid cavity, the dish-shaped portion of the lateral scapula.  The shallowness of the cavity and relatively loose connections between the shoulder and the rest of the body allows the arm to have tremendous mobility, at the expense of being much easier to dislocate than most other joints in the body. There is an approximately 4-to-1 disproportion in size between the large head of the humerus and the shallow glenoid cavity.The glenoid cavity is made deeper by the addition of the fibrocartilaginous ring of the glenoid labrum.

The capsule is a soft tissue envelope that encircles the glenohumeral joint and attaches to the scapula, humerus, and head of the biceps. It is lined by a thin, smooth synovial membrane.  This capsule is strengthened by the coracohumeral ligament which attaches the coracoid process of the scapula to the greater tubercle of the humerus.  There are also three other ligaments attaching the lesser tubercle of the humerus to lateral scapula and are collectively called the glenohumeral ligaments.

The transverse humeral ligament, which passes from the lesser tubercle to the greater tubercle of humerus, covers the intertubercular groove, in which the long head of biceps brachii travels.

Rotator cuff

The rotator cuff is an anatomical term given to the group of four muscles and their tendons that act to stabilize the shoulder. These muscles are the supraspinatus, infraspinatus, teres minor and subscapularis and that hold the head of the humerus in the glenoid cavity during movement. The cuff adheres to the glenohumeral capsule and attaches to the head of the humerus. Together, these keep the humeral head in the glenoid cavity, preventing upward migration of the humeral head caused by the pull of the deltoid muscle at the beginning of arm elevation. The infraspinatus and the teres minor, along with the anterior fibers of the deltoid muscle, are responsible for external rotation of the arm.

The four tendons of these muscles converge to form the rotator cuff tendon.  This tendon, along with the articular capsule, the coracohumeral ligament, and the glenohumeral ligament complex, blend into a confluent sheet before insertion into the humeral tuberosities.  The infraspinatus and teres minor fuse near their musculotendinous junctions, while the supraspinatus and subscapularis tendons join as a sheath that surrounds the biceps tendon at the entrance of the bicipital groove.

Other muscles
Muscles from the shoulder region

In addition to the four muscles of the rotator cuff, the deltoid muscle and teres major muscles arise and exist in the shoulder region itself. The deltoid muscle covers the shoulder joint on three sides, arising from the front upper third of the clavicle, the acromion, and the spine of the scapula, and travelling to insert on the deltoid tubercle of the humerus. Contraction of each part of the deltoid assists in different movements of the shoulder - flexion (clavicular part), abduction (middle part) and extension (scapular part). The teres major attaches to the outer part of the back of the scapula, beneath the teres minor, and attaches to the upper part of the humerus. It helps with medial rotation of the humerus.

Muscles from the front

Muscles from the chest wall that contribute to the shoulder are:

Muscles from the back

Armpit 
The armpit is formed by the space between the muscles of the shoulder. The nerves and blood vessels of the arm travel through the armpit, and it possesses several sets of lymph nodes that are able to be examined. The armpit is formed by the pectoralis major and minor muscles at the front, the latissimus dorsi and teres major muscles at the back, the serratus anterior muscle on its inner surface, and the intertubercular groove of the humerus on the outer side.

Nerve supply and passage 

The skin around the shoulder is supplied by C2-C4 (upper), and C7 and T2 (lower area). The brachial plexus emerges as nerve roots from the cervical vertebrae C5-T1. Branches of the plexus, in particular from C5-C6, supply the majority of the muscles of the shoulder.

Blood vessels 
The subclavian artery arises from the brachiocephalic trunk on the right and directly from the aorta from the left.  This becomes the axillary artery as it passes beyond the first rib. The axillary artery also supplies blood to the arm, and is one of the major sources of blood to the shoulder region. The other major sources are the transverse cervical artery and the suprascapular artery, both branches of the thyrocervical trunk which itself is a branch of the subclavian artery. The blood vessels form a network (anastamosis) behind the shoulder that helps to supply blood to the arm even when the axillary artery is compromised.

Function
The muscles and joints of the shoulder allow it to move through a remarkable range of motion, making it one of the most mobile joints in the human body.  The shoulder can abduct, adduct, rotate, be raised in front of and behind the torso and move through a full 360° in the sagittal plane.  This tremendous range of motion also makes the shoulder extremely unstable, far more prone to dislocation and injury than other joints

The following describes the terms used for different movements of the shoulder:

Development

Puberty
Under the influence of testosterone and growth hormone, the shoulders broaden in males during puberty.

Clinical significance

The shoulder is the most mobile and potentially unstable joint in the body. Due to this, it is often prone to problems.

Fracture 
Fractures of shoulder bones can include clavicular fractures, scapular fractures, and fractures of the upper humerus.

Pain 
Shoulder problems, including pain, are common and can relate to any of the structures within the shoulder. The primary cause of shoulder pain is a rotator cuff tear. The supraspinatus is most commonly involved in a rotator cuff tear.

When this type of cartilage starts to wear out (a process called arthritis), the joint becomes painful and stiff.
 Arthritis
 Frozen shoulder
 Impingement syndrome
 Shoulder dislocation
 Nerve entrapment syndrome

Imaging
Imaging of the shoulder includes ultrasound, X-ray and MRI, and is guided by the suspected diagnosis and presenting symptoms.

Conventional x-rays and ultrasonography are the primary tools used to confirm a diagnosis of injuries sustained to the rotator cuff. For extended clinical questions, imaging through Magnetic Resonance with or without intraarticular contrast agent is indicated.

Hodler et al. recommend starting scanning with conventional x-rays taken from at least two planes, since this method gives a wide first impression and even has the chance of exposing any frequent shoulder pathologies, i.e., decompensated rotator cuff tears, tendinitis calcarea, dislocations, fractures, usures, and/or osteophytes. Furthermore, x-rays are required for the planning of an optimal CT or MR image.

The conventional invasive arthrography is nowadays being replaced by the non-invasive MRI and ultrasound, and is used as an imaging reserve for patients who are contraindicated for MRI, for example pacemaker-carriers with an unclear and unsure ultrasonography.

X-ray
Projectional radiography views of the shoulder include:
AP-projection 40° posterior oblique after Grashey
The body has to be rotated about 30 to 45 degrees towards the shoulder to be imaged, and the standing or sitting patient lets the arm hang. This method reveals the joint gap and the vertical alignment towards the socket.

Transaxillary projection
The arm should be abducted 80 to 100 degrees. This method reveals:
 The horizontal alignment of the humerus head in respect to the socket and the lateral clavicle in respect to the acromion
 Lesions of the anterior and posterior socket border, or of the tuberculum minus
 The eventual non-closure of the acromial apophysis
 The coraco-humeral interval

Y-projection
The lateral contour of the shoulder should be positioned in front of the film in a way that the longitudinal axis of the scapula continues parallel to the path of the rays. This method reveals:
 The horizontal centralization of the humerus head and socket
 The osseous margins of the coraco-acromial arch and hence the supraspinatus outlet canal
 The shape of the acromion

This projection has a low tolerance for errors and, accordingly, needs proper execution. The Y-projection can be traced back to Wijnblath’s 1933 published cavitas-en-face projection.

Ultrasound
There are several advantages of ultrasound. It is relatively cheap, does not emit any radiation, is accessible, is capable of visualizing tissue function in real time, and allows the performance of provocative maneuvers in order to replicate the patient’s pain.  Those benefits have helped ultrasound become a common initial choice for assessing tendons and soft tissues. Limitations include, for example, the high degree of operator dependence and the inability to define pathologies in bones.  One also has to have an extensive anatomical knowledge of the examined region and keep an open mind to normal variations and artifacts created during the scan.

Although musculoskeletal ultrasound training, like medical training in general, is a lifelong process, Kissin et al. suggests that rheumatologists who taught themselves how to manipulate ultrasound can use it just as well as international musculo-skeletal ultrasound experts to diagnose common rheumatic conditions.

After the introduction of high-frequency transducers in the mid-1980s, ultrasound has become a conventional tool for taking accurate and precise images of the shoulder to support diagnosis.

Adequate for the examination are high-resolution, high-frequency transducers with a transmission frequency of 5, 7.5, and 10 MHz. To improve the focus on structures close to the skin an additional "water start-up length" is advisable. During the examination the patient is asked to be seated, the affected arm is then adducted and the elbow is bent to 90 degrees. Slow and cautious passive lateral and/or medial rotations have the effect of being able to visualize different sections of the shoulder. In order to also demonstrate those parts which are hidden under the acromion in the neutral position, a maximum medial rotation with hyperextension behind the back is required.

To avoid the different tendon echogenicities caused by different instrument settings, Middleton compared the tendon’s echogenicity with that of the deltoid muscle, which is still lege artis.

Usually the echogenicity compared to the deltoid muscle is homogeneous intensified without dorsal echo extinction. Variability with reduced or intensified echo has also been found in healthy tendons. Bilateral comparison is very helpful when distinguishing and setting boundaries between physiological variants and a possible pathological finding. Degenerative changes at the rotator cuff often are found on both sides of the body. Consequently, unilateral differences rather point to a pathological source and bilateral changes rather to a physiological variation.

In addition, a dynamic examination can help to differentiate between an ultrasound artifact and a real pathology.

To accurately evaluate the echogenicity of an ultrasound, one has to take into account the physical laws of reflection, absorption and dispersion. It is at all times important to acknowledge that the structures in the joint of the shoulder are not aligned in the transversal, coronal or sagittal plane, and that therefore during imaging of the shoulder the transducer head has to be held perpendicularly or parallel to the structures of interest. Otherwise the appearing echogenicity may not be evaluated.

MRI
Orthopedics established the MRI early on as the tool of choice for joint- and soft tissue-imaging because of its non-invasiveness, lack of radiation exposure, multi planar slicing possibilities and the high soft tissue contrast.

MRIs can provide joint details to the treating orthopedist, helping them to diagnose and decide the next appropriate therapeutic step.
To examine the shoulder, the patient should lay down with the concerned arm is in lateral rotation. For signal detection it is recommended to use a surface-coil. To find pathologies of the rotator cuff in the basic diagnostic investigation, T2-weighted sequences with fat-suppression or STIR sequences have proven value. In general, the examination should occur in the following three main planes: axial, oblique coronal and sagittal.

Most morphological changes and injuries are sustained to the supraspinatus tendon. Traumatic rotator cuff changes are often located antero-superior, meanwhile degenerative changes more likely are supero-posterior.

Tendons are predominantly composed of dense collagen fiber bundles. Because of their extreme short T2-relaxation time they appear typically signal-weak, respectively, dark. Degenerative changes, inflammations and also partial and complete tears cause loss of the original tendon structure. Fatty deposits, mucous degeneration and hemorrhages lead to an increased intratendinal T1-image. Edema formations, inflammatory changes and ruptures increase the signals in a T2-weighted image.

MRA
While using MRI, true lesions at the rotator interval region between the parts of the supraspinatus and subscapularis are all but impossible to distinguish from normal synovium and capsule.

In 1999, Weishaupt D. et al. reached through two readers a significant better visibility of pulley lesions at the rotator interval and the expected location of the reflection pulley of the long biceps and subscapularis tendon on parasagittal (reader1/reader2 sensitivity: 86%/100%; specificity: 90%/70%) and axial (reader1/reader2 sensitivity: 86%/93%; specificity: 90%/80%) MRA images.

When examining the rotator cuff, the MRA has a couple of advantages compared to the native MRI. Through a fat suppressed T2-weighted spin echo, MRA can reproduce an extreme high fat-water-contrast, which helps to detect water-deposits with better damage diagnosis in structurally changed collagen fiber bundles.

Other animals
Tetrapod forelimbs are characterised by a high degree of mobility in the shoulder-thorax connection.  Lacking a solid skeletal connection between the shoulder girdle and the vertebral column, the forelimb's attachment to the trunk is instead mainly controlled by serratus lateralis and levator scapulae.  Depending on locomotor style, a bone connects the shoulder girdle to the trunk in some animals; the coracoid bone in reptiles and birds, and the clavicle in primates and bats.

In primates, the shoulder shows characteristics that differ from other mammals, including a well developed clavicle, a dorsally shifted scapula with prominent acromion and spine, and a humerus featuring a straight shaft and a spherical head.

Additional images

See also

 Shoulder girdle (Pectoral girdle)
 Sternoclavicular joint
 Chip on shoulder
 Ambe
 Milwaukee shoulder syndrome

References

External links

 Video of the shoulder carriage in motion
 NIH (article includes text from this source)
 University of Michigan Medical School module on movements of the shoulder, arm, forearm, and hand

 
Upper limb anatomy